Republic Road 12 (Bulgarian: Републикански път I-12) is a short second-class road in the extreme north-west of Bulgaria.

Description
The road starts right after the Bregovo border crossing to Serbia. The road continues through Bregovo and into the countryside. The road bypasses the village of Gamzovo and then continues through another village, Inovo. The road ends outside of Vidin at the I-1 road.

References

Roads in Bulgaria